John Aylmer (c. 1652 – 1705) was an Irish politician.

Aylmer represented Naas in the Irish House of Commons between 1692 and 1693.

References

1650s births
Year of birth uncertain
1705 deaths
Irish MPs 1692–1693
Members of the Parliament of Ireland (pre-1801) for County Kildare constituencies